Ominami, Ōminami or Oominami (written: 大南) is a Japanese surname. Notable people with the surname include:

Carlos Ominami, Chilean economist and politician
, Japanese long-distance runner
, Japanese long-distance runner
, Japanese footballer

See also
Marco Enríquez-Ominami, Chilean filmmaker and politician

Japanese-language surnames